WVIA-FM (89.9 FM) is a non-commercial, public FM radio station licensed to serve Scranton, Pennsylvania and is the National Public Radio member station for Northeastern Pennsylvania. The station is owned by the Northeastern Pennsylvania Educational Television Association along with its sister television station, WVIA-TV.

WVIA-FM uses HD Radio. The station owns Chiaroscuro Records and broadcasts "The Chiaroscuro Channel" on its HD3 channel with a jazz format.

History
WVIA-FM signed on for the first time on April 23, 1973.

The building housing the transmitters for WVIA-FM and WVIA-TV was destroyed by fire on February 12, 2010. WVIA-FM resumed broadcasting at low power on February 17, 2010, and returned to full-power at Noon on August 3, 2010.

WVIA-FM has operated a translator at 89.3 FM in Williamsport since the late 1970s. In 2002, WVIA-FM's owners signed on WVYA, a full-power Class A station, to provide better coverage in that area. In 2010, a third full-power station, WTIO in Mainesburg, was brought online, taking over from a translator that had served the Tioga Valley. A fourth station joined the group in 2012, when WPAU signed on from Palmyra Township to serve the far northeastern corner of the state.

Simulcasts and translators
Four full-power stations are licensed to simulcast the programming of WVIA-FM full-time:

WVIA-FM programming is broadcast on the following translators:

References

External links 
 

VIA-FM
NPR member stations
Radio stations established in 1973
1973 establishments in Pennsylvania